Chaetodactylus is a genus of parasitic mite primarily associated with solitary bees with over 20 species.

These mites usually kill young bee larvae and feed on provisioned pollen and nectar. In nests with partitions (Osmia), bees that develop in the innermost cells chew their way out of the nest, and phoretic deutonymphs from the opened cells may attach to them. The mites in the innermost cell may die because of their inability to break through the partition. In nests without partitions (Lithurgus), some young bees may complete development and transform to adults that disperse the mites.

In colonies of Osmia cornifrons managed for pollination of blueberries in the US, Ch. krombeini phoretic deutonymphs could disperse from a nest to nearby nests by walking through nest entrances and holes made by parasitic wasps. Cross-nest dispersal via blueberry flowers visited by multiple individuals of O. cornifrons was proven to be negligible.

Life cycle 
Feeding stages live in bee nests. They are mostly kleptoparasitic, but they may kill developing bee larvae via direct attack.

Phoretic deutonymphs (non-feeding stage) disperse from one nest to another on adult bees. They cause no direct harm, but large mite loads may affect the bee's flying abilities and survival. In managed and aggregated bee colonies, they may infect new nests by active dispersal (walking).

Non-phoretic deutonymphs (non-feeding stage) can survive in the nest cavity to infest new bee generations, if the same nest is reused.

The presence of the inert non-phoretic deutonymph along with the phoretic deutonymph is the most conspicuous feature in the life-cycle of this genus. The inert deutonymph is a highly regressive, cyst-like morph with legs and most setae greatly reduced. It is capable of surviving in old bee nests and infesting new hosts that reuse these nests or the nest material. When mites are trapped in the innermost cells of an infested nest or all bee larvae are killed and therefore cannot transfer mites to a new nest as adults, inert deutonymphs can be very important for mite survival.

Systematics 

 Subgenus Chaetodactylus Rondani, 1866 (Also called Trichotarsus Canestrini, 1888)
 Chaetodactylus chrysidis Fain & Baugnee, 1996 — host: Chrysura trimaculata;
 Chaetodactylus dalyi Fain, 1974
 Chaetodactylus hirashimai Kurosa, 1987 — host: Osmia excavata; 
 Chaetodactylus ludwigi (Trouessart, 1904)
 Chaetodactylus nipponicus Kurosa, 1987 —host: Osmia cornifrons; 
 Chaetodactylus osmiae (Dufour, 1839) (Previously called Trichodactylus osmiae Dufour, 1839)
 Chaetodactylus panamensis Baker, Roubik & Delfinado-Baker, 1987
 Chaetodactylus reaumuri Oudemans, 1905
 Subgenus Ochaetodactylus Fain, 1981
 Chaetodactylus decellei Fain, 1974
 Subgenus Spinodactylus Fain, 1981
 Chaetodactylus claviger Oudemans, 1928
 Chaetodactylus krombeini Baker, 1962
 Subgenus Achaetodactylus Fain, 1981
 Chaetodactylus ceratinae Fain, 1976
 Chaetodactylus dementjevi Zachvatkin, 1941
 Chaetodactylus leleupi Fain, 1974
 Unknown
 Chaetodactylus zachvatkini Klimov and OConnor, 2008
 Chaetodactylus micheneri Klimov and OConnor, 2008

References 

Parasitic acari
Sarcoptiformes
Taxa named by Camillo Rondani